is a former Japanese football player and manager. He played for and managed the Japan national team. He is the founder and honorary chairman of the J.League. Between 2002 and 2008, he served as president of the Japan Football Association.

Early life
Kawabuchi was born in Takaishi on December 3, 1936. At first, when he was in Takaishi elementary school and Takaishi Junior high school, he played baseball. He was on to Mikunigaoka High School, Osaka and became a member of football team at the high school. He graduated from Mikunigaoka High School, Osaka in 1955. He went on to Waseda University School of commerce in 1957. He played for the Waseda University football team. He earned a bachelor of arts degree in commerce from Waseda University.

Club career
After graduating from Waseda University, Kawabuchi played for Furukawa Electric, in the early days of the Japan Soccer League. In the initial league season, he was the first player to score a hat-trick, against Nagoya Mutual Bank. He retired in 1970. He played 68 games and scored 10 goals in the league.

National team career
On December 25, 1958, when Kawabuchi was a Waseda University student, he debuted and scored 2 goals for Japan national team against Hong Kong. In 1962, he played at 1962 Asian Games. In 1964, he was selected Japan for 1964 Summer Olympics in Tokyo. At 1964 Summer Olympics, he scored a goal in first match against Argentina. He also played at 1962 Asian Games. He played 26 games and scored 8 goals for Japan until 1965.

Coaching career
After retirement, Kawabuchi became a coach for Furukawa Electric in 1970. In 1973, he became a manager and managed until 1975. Just before 1982 World Cup qualification in December 1980, he was named manager for the Japan national team and replaced Masashi Watanabe, who suffered a subarachnoid hemorrhage. Kawabuchi managed Japan at the 1982 World Cup qualification and managed until March 1981.

In 1991, he was named the inaugural chairman of the J.League, as the first professional league in Japan. In 1991, he also became the first chairman of the J.League. In 2002, he resigned as chairman of the J.League and became the 10th president of the Japan Football Association as Shunichiro Okano's successor. Kawabuchi served until 2008. He also served as president of the Japan Basketball Association from May 2015 to June 2016.

In 2006, he received the FIFA Order of Merit. In 2008, he was also selected for the Japan Football Hall of Fame.

Later years
Kawabuchi serves as a councilor on the organizing committee for the 2020 Summer Olympic and Paralympic Games. He had been requested by former Prime Minister Yoshirō Mori to succeed him as committee chairperson in February 2021, but Kawabuchi later said that he would not accept the request.

Club statistics

National team statistics

Awards
 Japan Soccer League Silver Ball (Assist Leader): 1966

Books
 J's career – With Japan football, Nihon Keizai Shimbun Shuppan, 2009

References

External links

 
 Japan National Football Team Database
Japan Football Hall of Fame at Japan Football Association

1936 births
Living people
Waseda University alumni
Association football people from Osaka Prefecture
Japanese footballers
Japan international footballers
Japan Soccer League players
JEF United Chiba players
Olympic footballers of Japan
Footballers at the 1964 Summer Olympics
Footballers at the 1962 Asian Games
Japanese football managers
Japan national football team managers
Recipients of the Order of the Rising Sun
Association football forwards
People from Takaishi, Osaka
Asian Games competitors for Japan
Basketball executives